The Utah House of Representatives is the lower house of the Utah State Legislature, the state legislature of the U.S. state of Utah. The House is composed of 75 representatives elected from single member constituent districts. Each district contains an average population of 44,000 people. Members of the House are elected to two-year terms without term limits. The House convenes at the Utah State Capitol in Salt Lake City.

Composition of the House of Representatives

Leadership

Members of the 64th House of Representatives

 * Representative was originally appointed to office.
 †Travis Seegmiller has announced his resignation from office, effective July 1, 2022.

Past composition of the House of Representatives

See also
Utah State Legislative districts
Utah State Senate
List of Utah State Legislatures
Elections in Utah
Utah Republican Party
Utah Democratic Party

References

External links
Utah House of Representatives
Utah Republican Party
Utah Democratic Party
Map of Utah House of Representative districts

Utah Legislature
State lower houses in the United States